Genlin, also known as Horiike Hiroshi (Japanese) and Peng Hongling (birth name), is a Chinese entrepreneur, philanthropist, painter, animal activist and the founder of Large Horse International (Group) Company Limited and World Dog Alliance.

Life 
Peng Hongling was born in Shanghai with the ancestral origin in Guizhou, China. His father was Peng Xinchao. After Peng Hongling graduated from the International Business School of Shanghai University, he moved to Japan and worked in Nissho Iwai Corporation. He founded Large Horse International (Group) Company Limited in 1994 in Hong Kong.

Peng Hongling is committed to charity and public welfare undertakings. He donated funds to build schools, libraries, gymnasiums, and to establish a number of scholarships. He promised that "90% of his personal property will be used for charity, and 10% will be reserved for his family."

In 1995, he founded Peng Xin Chao Foundation in Guizhou using his father's name in 1995, donating to build a primary school and library. He also founded other charity organizations, such as Genlin Foundation and Genlin World Heritage Foundation. Since 2007, Genlin Foundation has established "Shanghai University Genlin Sports Elite Award Fund", "Shanghai University Genlin Art Elite Award Fund" and "Shanghai University Foreign Language School Genlin Education Fund", and donated to build Genlin Tennis Hall.

Peng Hongling's artwork include numerous pieces of oil painting featuring dogs, exhibited in Dog Lovers' Day. He once stated that he would not sell or gift his paintings to anyone, and imperfect ones would be destroyed.。

Peng Hongling is also the Honourable Board Member and Outstanding Alumnus of Shanghai University.

Animal Protection 
Genlin's animal charity revolves around the promotion of the legislation against dog meat consumption worldwide, hoping to eliminate the practice in Asia.

In 2014, Peng Hongling discovered that dog meat was a "cuisine" in his hometown Guizhou, and decided to campaign for legislation to outlaw human consumption of dog meat. He founded World Dog Alliance (WDA) the same year, aiming to push forward "Explicit Legislation against Dog Meat Consumption" in Asia. He scripted and directed the documentary Eating Happiness, traveling to places including China, Korea and Vietnam to film the situation of dog meat industry. The screening of the documentary was held on 1 November 2015, joined by Mickey Rourke.

In December 2018, the Congress of United States passed the bill to outlaw the eating of dogs and cats, supported by World Dog Alliance's legislative efforts since 2015.

In 2019, he established Asia Animal-friendly Alliance with Wang Yumin, a member of Taiwan Legislative Yuan and Kusuo Oshima, a member of House of Councillors (Japan).

In February 2020, U.S. Representatives Alcee Hastings and Rodney Davis united 28 other lawmakers to sign on a letter to President Donald Trump, urging him to lead the International Agreement to Prohibit the Eating of Dogs and Cats.

In March 2020, 67 supra-partisan UK Members of Parliament to co-sign a letter to Prime Minister Boris Johnson, urging the governments to initiate the International Agreement to Prohibit the Eating of Dogs and Cats.

On 1 May 2020, Shenzhen became the first city in China to outlaw the eating of dog and cat meat,

On 4 December 2020, Hidehisa Otsuji, chairman of the Parliamentary League for Animal Welfare, led 10 other members to submit a letter requesting Prime Minister Suga Yoshihide to jointly initiate the International Agreement to Prohibit the Eating of Dogs and Cats with the United States.

Related events 
In 2007, Peng Hongling purchased a mansion in Malibu, Los Angeles County, United States. Later he noticed the actual area was one-third less than which promised by the agency of the seller. In 2010, he sued the agency of the seller and Real estate agency.

Achievements 

 In October 2018, he was awarded "International Dog Lover Award" by a parliamentary animal right organization in Italy (issued by the member of Chamber of Deputies (Italy) Michela Vittoria Brambilla).

References

External links 
 
 

Living people
Painters from Shanghai
Businesspeople from Shanghai
Shanghai University alumni
Sojitz people
Chinese animal rights activists
Founders of charities
21st-century Chinese painters
Animal painters
Businesspeople from Guizhou
Painters from Guizhou
People from Malibu, California
Year of birth missing (living people)